German submarine U-452 was a Type VIIC U-boat of Nazi Germany's Kriegsmarine during World War II.

She carried out one patrol. She sank no ships.

She was sunk by a British aircraft and a British warship southeast of Iceland on 25 August 1941.

Design
German Type VIIC submarines were preceded by the shorter Type VIIB submarines. U-452 had a displacement of  when at the surface and  while submerged. She had two shafts and two  propellers.

U-452 was fitted with five  torpedo tubes (four fitted at the bow and one at the stern), fourteen torpedoes, one  SK C/35 naval gun, 220 rounds, and a  C/30 anti-aircraft gun. The boat had a complement of between forty-four and sixty.

Service history
The submarine was laid down on 25 May 1940 at the Deutsche Werke in Kiel as yard number 283, launched on 29 March 1941 and commissioned on 29 May under the command of Kapitänleutnant Jürgen March.

She served with the 3rd U-boat Flotilla from 29 May 1941 for training and stayed with that organization for operations.

Patrol and loss
U-452s only patrol began with her departure from Trondheim in Norway on 19 August 1941.

Forty-two men went down with U-452; there were no survivors.

References

Bibliography

External links

German Type VIIC submarines
U-boats commissioned in 1941
U-boats sunk in 1941
U-boats sunk by British aircraft
U-boats sunk by British warships
U-boats sunk by depth charges
1941 ships
Ships built in Kiel
Ships lost with all hands
World War II submarines of Germany
Maritime incidents in August 1941